Majid bin Abdullah Al-Hogail (Arabic: ماجد الحقيل) is the Minister of Housing of Saudi Arabia was appointed in July 2015. He is also the acting Minister of Municipal and Rural Affairs since 25 February 2020. Al-Hogail has also been serving as the chairman of the Real Estate General Authority since January 2017.

Education 
In 1998, Al-Hogail gained a master's degree in business administration from the University of Illinois at Urbana-Champaign in the USA, where In 2007,  he completed an extended development program in management from Switzerland.

Career 
Al-Hogail previously served in several companies in the private sector. As from 2007 was the managing director of the RAFAL, a Real Estate Development company. Then in 2014, he was chosen as a chairmen of the Aljazira Capital. In 2015, he was a board member of budget airline Flynas.

Currently, Al-Hogail is a board member in Qiddiya and NEOM megaprojects.

References 

Living people
Year of birth missing (living people)